Harald Cuypers is a West German retired slalom canoeist who competed in the 1960s and 1970s. He won four medals at the ICF Canoe Slalom World Championships with a gold (C-1 team: 1969), two silvers (C-1: 1967, C-1 team: 1971) and a bronze (1967).

References

German male canoeists
Possibly living people
Year of birth missing (living people)
Medalists at the ICF Canoe Slalom World Championships